Dancers in the Dark is a 1932 American pre-Code film about a taxi dancer (Miriam Hopkins), a big band leader (Jack Oakie), and a gangster (George Raft).

George Raft, billed sixth, was listed much lower in the cast than the size of his role indicated because he was at the dawn of his career. His part was as large as any of the other players except for Hopkins and arguably Oakie. The same thing had happened to Raft previously in his earlier film Quick Millions, a gangster vehicle starring Spencer Tracy, in which Raft's role was extremely large and colorful, even featuring some dancing.

Plot
The story takes place at a downtown dance hall in which Duke Taylor is the band leader, Gloria Bishop the singer, Floyd Stevens the saxophonist and Louie Brooks a local gangster and regular patron.

Gloria has a "past" with both Duke and Louie but as the film opens is falling for Floyd. Floyd is steady and true but might not be if he knew more about her romantic history. Duke thinks Gloria is not good enough for Floyd whom he treats as a brother. Louie is interested in having her back but not as much as he wants to rob premises upstairs from the dance hall.

Floyd proposes to Gloria; she accepts but is worried about her past and puts him off. Duke manoeuvres him out of town for a few months and sets about luring Gloria back to him to expose her shallow nature. The ploy fails because he starts to fall in love with her as well. In the meantime the robbery takes place (off screen) and Louie kills someone but isn't caught. Floyd comes back and after a rapid sequence of misunderstandings and the arrival of the police looking for Louie everything works out nicely.

Cast

Miriam Hopkins as Gloria Bishop
Jack Oakie as Duke Taylor
William Collier, Jr. as Floyd Stevens
Eugene Pallette as Gus
Lyda Roberti as Fanny Zabowolski
George Raft as Louie Brooks
Paul Fix as Benny
Adelaide Hall (Hall's singing voice is used but she is uncredited on the movie credits)

Production
The film was based on a play The Jazz King by James Creely who was better known as a screenwriter. In March 1929 it was announce the play would be put on next October. It was not produced on Broadway. In October 1931 Paramount bought screen rights to the play which was also known as St Louis Blues and Master of Ceremonies. The same month it was announced the film would star Miriam Hopkins and Charles Buddy Rogers. The film was conceived a drama with musical interludes.

Filming started under the title The Jazz King.

Raft was later signed to a long term contract by Paramount. He made it after Scarface but before that film was released.

Reception
The New York Times called it "curiously tedious."

References

External links
 
Dancers in the Dark at Letterbox

1932 films
1932 drama films
Films with screenplays by Herman J. Mankiewicz
American drama films
Films directed by David Burton
American black-and-white films
1930s English-language films
1930s American films